Steven J. Hatchell is an American sports administrator who currently serves as the president and CEO of the National Football Foundation (NFF) & College Hall of Fame, Inc., which operates the College Football Hall of Fame in Atlanta.

Hatchell joined the NFF after serving for six years as the commissioner of the Professional Rodeo Cowboys Association (PRCA). Prior to the PRCA, he served as the first commissioner of the Big 12 Conference in Dallas, an entity he helped establish in 1995. While with the Big 12, he played a key role in negotiating the television contracts and bowl game formula for the conference. During his time at the Big 12, he also served as the chairman of the Power of One, an NCAA promotional initiative to combine the marketing resources of collegiate sports into a unified force and led the Bowl Alliance as its chairman for six years.

From 1987 to 1993, Hatchell headed the Orange Bowl as its executive director, landing Federal Express (now FedEx) as its title sponsor. He was director of sports information for Colorado State University from 1976 to 1977 before leaving to become an associate commissioner of the Big Eight Conference, where he served from 1977 to 1983. He left to become the commissioner of the Metropolitan Collegiate Athletic Conference, a post he held from 1983 to 1987. After his time at the Orange Bowl in 1993, he began a two-year stint as the commissioner of the Southwest Conference.

Hatchell has served on several United States Olympic Committee boards and as part of the staff for three Olympic Games. He served on the board of Catholic Campus Ministries from 2000 to 2005 and was also information director for the Rocky Mountain Intercollegiate Ski Association (RMISA) and on the board of directors for the Doral Ryder Open in Miami. He currently serves on the Development Steering Committee for Special Olympics of Texas. 

He graduated from University of Colorado with a journalism degree in 1970, and he was inducted into the CU Athletic Hall of Fame in 2017. The Football Writers Association of America (FWAA) named him as the 2015 recipient of the FWAA Bert McGrane Award for his contributions to the coverage of college football, and the National Association of Collegiate Directors of Athletics (NACDA) presented him a Golden Anniversary Award in 2015, recognizing his impact on NACDA over its first 50 years. College Sports Communicators (CSC and formerly known as CoSIDA) inducted him into the organization's Hall of Fame in 2018. In 1983, Hatchell received the Honorary C Club Award from Colorado. 

In 2022, Hatchell was honored as a 2022 Father of the Year in Dallas, and the National Football Foundation named its top high school team academic award as "The Hatchell Cup" in his honor.

His wife, Patty, of 49 years died in 2021, and they have two sons.

References

Year of birth missing (living people)
Living people
Big 12 Conference commissioners
Colorado State University people
Metro Conference commissioners
Southwest Conference commissioners
College football bowl executives
University of Colorado alumni